Sir Jameson Boyd Adams  (6 March 1880 – 30 April 1962) was a British Antarctic explorer and Royal Naval Reserve officer. He participated in the Nimrod expedition, the first expedition led by Ernest Shackleton in an unsuccessful attempt to reach the South Pole.

Biography
Born in Rippingale, Lincolnshire, the son of a doctor and the grandson of a captain in the Indian Navy, he ran away from school to enter the merchant navy at the age of 13. In 1902 he became a sub-lieutenant in the Royal Naval Reserve, and on reaching the rank of Lieutenant he was one of the last to gain a Master Mariner's certificate under sail. But he gave up a promising career to join Ernest Shackleton as the second-in-command of the Nimrod Expedition. Despite the expedition's ultimate failure, he was one of the party of four who reached the Polar Plateau for the first time ever, thus showing the way to the Pole.

On his return from the Antarctic in 1909, he entered the Civil Service, where a year later he was appointed head of the North-Eastern Division of the Employment Exchanges. Recalled to the Navy on the outbreak of the First World War, he became Flag Lieutenant to Admiral Hood commanding the Dover Patrol. Then, after a period of special work at the Ministry of Munitions, he was posted to Flanders to command a battery of naval siege guns. A bad wound in the head necessitated his return in 1917, and he was awarded the Distinguished Service Order and the Croix de Guerre for his services.

After the war, he returned to the Ministry of Labour as Controller for the North-Eastern Division, and such spare time as he had was largely devoted to helping boys' clubs. In 1928 was made Commander of the Order of the British Empire. He left the service in 1935 to become Secretary of King George's Jubilee Trust for youth. He remained in this post, apart from further distinguished service in the Second World War, until his retirement in 1948, when he was knighted in the Royal Victorian Order.

He lived above Pratt's and became the honorary appeals secretary for King Edward VII's Hospital for Officers, where he worked right up to his death in 1962.

Character and legacy
In appropriate company, his use of somewhat crude invective was often unrestrained, and he was never deterred by convention from saying what he thought. He preferred to be known by allcomers, from porters to the royal family, simply as "The Mate".

In November 2008, 100 years after the Nimrod Expedition began, one of "The Mate's" great-grandsons, Henry Adams, set off from the Shackleton Hut with two other members of the Shackleton Centenary Expedition to complete the whole  to the South Pole on foot, hauling their own supplies, unassisted. In January 2009, another of "The Mate's" great-grandsons, David Cornell, joined the Expedition at the Farthest South  to complete the last  of unfinished family business.

References

External links 
 Royal Navy (RN) Officers 1939–1945

1880 births
1962 deaths
Commanders of the Order of the British Empire
Companions of the Distinguished Service Order
English polar explorers
Explorers of Antarctica
Knights Commander of the Royal Victorian Order
Recipients of the Croix de Guerre 1914–1918 (France)
Royal Navy officers of World War I
Royal Navy officers of World War II
Civil servants in the Ministry of Labour
Civil servants in the Ministry of Munitions
British Merchant Navy officers
South Pole
Royal Naval Reserve personnel
Royal Navy officers
Military personnel from Lincolnshire